Edward "Ed" Komarnicki (born November 18, 1949) is a Canadian politician and lawyer.

Born in Cudworth, Saskatchewan, Komarnicki was elected into the House of Commons of Canada in the 2004 Canadian federal election as the Conservative Party of Canada candidate in the riding of Souris—Moose Mountain. He was elected by nearly 3,000 votes over former premier Grant Devine who was running as an independent. Komarnicki was re-elected in each subsequent election, in 2006, 2008 and 2011, each time with a larger percentage of votes.

During late February 2013, Komarnicki announced that he would not stand for re-election at the next federal election.

Career in the House
In October 2004, Komarnicki became a member of the Standing Committee on Human Resources, Skills Development, Social Development and the Status of Persons with Disabilities (HUMA). In 2006 he became the Parliamentary Secretary to the Minister of Citizenship and Immigration, and a member of the Standing Committee on Citizenship and Immigration. In 2008 he returned to his previous file as the new Parliamentary Secretary to the Minister of Human Resources, Skills Development and the Status of Persons with Disabilities. This change also meant returning to the HUMA committee. After winning re-election in the 2011 General Election, Komarnicki became chair of the HUMA committee.

Electoral record

References

External links
 Official website

1949 births
Living people
Conservative Party of Canada MPs
Members of the House of Commons of Canada from Saskatchewan
People from Estevan
21st-century Canadian politicians